Jasper Lake is a lake located in the Rockies of Jasper National Park in Alberta, Canada. It is part of the Athabasca River, where the river broadens out.

Jasper Lake Sand Dunes
 
One unique feature of the lake is the Jasper Lake Sand Dunes. It is the only sand dune ecosystem in the Canadian Rockies.  The dunes were formed at the edge of the lake during the last ice age and have been constantly reshaped by wind and water ever since. Acting as a kind of sieve, the lake removes silt and sand from the river, allowing it to sink to the lake bed. When the water level recedes in the fall, vast sand flats are exposed and dry out, becoming vulnerable to the strong westerly winds that sweep through the lower Athabasca Valley. In winter, these winds blow the sand and silt down the valley, forming two large dune islands near the northwest shore of Jasper Lake. In the lee of the dunes, mature clumps of spruce and balsam poplar have gained a stronghold, with colonizing grasses, rose bushes and willows. As water from the river flows into the lake, silt and sand sink down to the lake bed. In Autumn, when the water level goes down, the silt and sand are exposed and become dry, and are then swept up by the strong westerly winds of the Athabasca Valley.

Surrounded by mountains
The lake is surrounded by mountain ranges, many of which can be seen from various parts along the lake. From southeast to southwest:

 Miette Range.  Most prominent peaks include Utopia Mountain (2,602 m or 8,537 ft) and Roche Miette (2,316 m or 7,600 ft).
 Jacques Range. Prominent peaks: Cinquefoil Mountain,  Roche Jacques, and Mount Merlin.
 Colin Range: Peaks include Mount Colin
Northwest to northeast:
 Victoria Cross Ranges—so named because six of the peaks are named after Canadian recipients of the Victoria Cross.
 De Smet Range. Prominent peaks include: Roche de Smet, and Mount Greenock.
 Bosche Range: Mount Aeolus and  Roche à Bosche

Transportation corridors
 
The Canadian National Railway skirts the northern shore of the lake. Parts of its mainline have been built on causeways away from the shore, which have created several mini lakes. Via Rail's passenger train the Canadian uses this same CN line as part of its journey from Toronto to Vancouver, giving train passengers up-close views of the lake, sand dunes, and surrounding mountains. This area has been the site of many CN publicity photographs—including of the Super Continental—through the years, and it is still popular with photographers, railfans, the present-day Canadian and its advertisers and passengers.

The Yellowhead Highway (Highway 16) skirts the southern shore of the lake, built upon the abandoned grade of the Grand Trunk Pacific Railway, and it too has segments of its route on causeways, which have created  Edna and Talbot lakes. This highway is the main east-west route between Winnipeg and Edmonton and other points east and Jasper and points farther west and helps provide access to other parts of Jasper National Park.

References

External links

 Jasper National Park.com
 peakfinder.com
 www.pc.gc.ca/ 

Jasper National Park
Lakes of Alberta